Eretmocrinus is an extinct genus of crinoids.

Fossil records
This genus is known in the fossil record of the Carboniferous period (age range: 353.8 to 311.45 million years ago). Fossils of species within this genus have been found in Canada and United States.

References 

Monobathrida
Prehistoric crinoid genera
Paleozoic life of Alberta